Claudio Böckli (born 20 June 1984) is a retired Swiss biathlete. He competed at the Biathlon World Championships 2012 in Ruhpolding and at the Biathlon World Championships 2013 in Nove Mesto na Morave. He competed at the 2014 Winter Olympics in Sochi, in the individual contest.

References 

1984 births
Living people
Biathletes at the 2014 Winter Olympics
Swiss male biathletes
Olympic biathletes of Switzerland